The Attorney General of Saint Kitts and Nevis is the primary legal advisor to the Government of Saint Kitts and Nevis. They are an elected or nominated ex-officio member of the National Assembly and member of the cabinet.

For Attorneys General before 1958, see Attorney General of the Leeward Islands.

List of attorneys general of Saint Kitts and Nevis

 Saint Kitts-Nevis-Anguilla created, 1958
 Joseph Samuel Archibald 1960–1964 (Crown Attorney) 
 Cecil Oliver Byron 1962 (Crown Attorney - 8 months) 
 Joseph Samuel Archibald 1966–1968 (Crown Attorney)
 Anguilla seceded, 1971
 Lee Llewellyn Moore 1971–1979 
 Clarence Fitzroy Bryant 1979-1980
 Samuel Weymouth Tapley Seaton 1980–1995  (afterwards Governor-General, 2015)
 Saint Kitts and Nevis became independent, 1983
 Delano Frank Bart 1995–2001 
 Dennis H. Merchant 2006–2010 
 Patrice D.H. Nisbett 2010-?2013 
 Jason Hamilton 2013–2015 
 Vincent Fitzgerald Byron 2015-2022 
 Garth Wilkin 2022-present

References

Government of Saint Kitts and Nevis